Trichaeta quadriplagata is a moth in the subfamily Arctiinae. It was described by Pieter Cornelius Tobias Snellen in 1895. It is found on Sumatra.

References

Moths described in 1895
Arctiinae